Newlyn Downs is a Site of Special Scientific Interest (SSSI) in north Cornwall, England, UK, noted for its biological characteristics.

Geography
The streams that rise on the site are tributaries of the River Gannel. The Downs are also designated a Special Area of Conservation.

Wildlife and ecology
The soil of the site, deriving from slate-based mudstones and siltstones, is permanently waterlogged in large places. It is the foundation for the largest area in Cornwall of Southern Atlantic wet heath, containing cross-leaved heath (Erica tetralix) and Dorset heath (Erica ciliaris).

References

Sites of Special Scientific Interest in Cornwall
Sites of Special Scientific Interest notified in 1997
Special Areas of Conservation in Cornwall